Osborne Park is a cricket ground in Belfast, Northern Ireland.

History
Established in 1912, Osborne Park is owned by the Royal Belfast Academical Institution and is used as their main sports field. The ground was selected to host two List A matches in the 2005 ICC Trophy, hosting Netherlands v Papua New Guinea, and three days later Namibia v Netherlands.

Records

List A
 Highest team total: 189/4 by Netherlands v Nambia, 2005
 Lowest team total: 69 by Papua New Guinea v Netherlands, 2005
 Highest individual innings: 65* by Bas Zuiderent for Netherlands v Namibia, 2005
 Best bowling in an innings: 5-20 by Edgar Schiferli for Netherlands v Papua New Guinea, 2005

See also
List of cricket grounds in Ireland

References

External links
Osborne Park at CricketArchive

Cricket grounds in Northern Ireland
Sports venues in Belfast
Sports venues completed in 1912
1912 establishments in Ireland